Harbor Island is a small residential island located 14 miles (22 km) east of Beaufort, South Carolina. It is one of the Carolina Sea Islands. The swing drawbridge has been replaced by a fixed high level bridge.
, Harbor River Bridge, that connects the island to Saint Helena Island towards the west. A small causeway crossing Johnson Creek connects Harbor Island with Hunting Island towards the south.

The residential portion of the island was listed as a census-designated place in the 2020 census with a population of 209.

History

The island was uninhabited and used primarily as hunting grounds until the 1930s, when U.S. Highway 21 was constructed to connect Saint Helena Island with Hunting Island.

Development on Harbor Island remained scarce until The Fripp Company (developers of nearby Fripp Island) purchased the majority of land on the island and developed a gated residential and resort community. Small scale commercial development exists along U.S. 21.

In November 2018, the South Carolina Environmental Law Project filed a lawsuit on behalf of the Harbor Island Owners Association asking the Beaufort County Circuit Court to order the State to remove seven houses that through rapid erosion have ended up in the water on the beach below the mean high water mark. The state was released from the action in 2018 leaving the homeowners and the Association as parties to the suit.

In 2019, the South Carolina Department of Transportation (SCDOT) started a project to replace the Harbor River Bridge with completion expected by 2022.

Nature
Harbor Island is a certified Community Wildlife Habitat by the National Wildlife Federation.

Birds
Harbor Island is part of the Beaufort Barrier Islands Important Bird Area.

Sea Turtles
Harbor Island has a Sea Turtle Nest Protection Program that is permitted by the South Carolina Department of Natural Resources and is run by volunteers.

Demographics 

The residential portion of the island was listed as a census-designated place in 2020. Per the 2020 census, the population was 209.

2020 census

References

External links 

 Harbor Island Owners Association
 Harbor Island's Sea Turtle Nesting Program
 Beaufort Barrier Islands Important Bird Area
 Community Wildlife Habitat by the National Wildlife Federation

Islands of Beaufort County, South Carolina
Islands of South Carolina
Hilton Head Island–Beaufort micropolitan area
South Carolina Sea Islands